A Preferred List is a 1933 American Pre-Code short comedy film produced by Lou Brock. At the  6th Academy Awards, held in 1933, it was nominated for an Academy Award for Best Short Subject (Comedy).

Cast
 Ken Murray
 Dorothy Lee

References

External links

1933 films
1933 comedy films
1933 short films
American black-and-white films
Columbia Pictures short films
Films directed by Leigh Jason
American comedy short films
1930s English-language films
1930s American films